Slovakia as such made its Paralympic Games début at the 1994 Winter Paralympics in Lillehammer, following the break-up of Czechoslovakia, which had taken part in the Paralympics from 1972 to 1992. Slovakia has taken part in every edition of both the Summer and Winter Paralympics since then.

Their total medal count of nine gold, two silver and one bronze from 2010 Vancouver, 2014 Sochi and 2018 Pyeongchang makes them Slovakia's most successful Paralympians.

Among pioneers, Jozef Miština won four of the country's five medals at the 1994 Games: three silver and a bronze in alpine skiing. He won four medals again (two silver and two bronze) in 1998.

In 2010, Slovakia won its first Winter gold medals, with Henrieta Farkašová and Jakub Krako each winning three gold and a silver in visually impaired alpine skiing. This led to Slovakia's best result at the Paralympic Games: the country ranked fourth on the medal table.

Medal tallies

Medals by Summer Paralympics

Medals by Winter Paralympics

Medals by summer sport

Medals by winter sport

List of medalists

Summer Paralympics

Winter Paralympics

Most successful Slovak competitors

See also
Slovakia at the European Games
Slovakia at the European Youth Olympic Festival
Slovakia at the Olympics
Slovakia at the Universiade
Slovakia at the World Games
Slovakia at the Youth Olympics

References